The name Chan-hom has been used to name four tropical cyclones in the Western North Pacific Ocean. The name is a type of tree and was submitted by Laos. 
 Typhoon Chan-hom (2003) (T0303, 04W), strong storm that stayed away from land
 Typhoon Chan-hom (2009) (T0902, 02W, Emong), formed off Vietnam, reached typhoon status before landfall in the Philippines
 Typhoon Chan-hom (2015) (T1509, 09W, Falcon), a large typhoon which affected several countries in eastern Asia
 Typhoon Chan-hom (2020) (T2014, 16W), a typhoon that brushed Japan

Pacific typhoon set index articles